Henry Melchior Muhlenberg (an anglicanization of Heinrich Melchior Mühlenberg) (September 6, 1711 – October 7, 1787), was a German Lutheran pastor sent to North America as a missionary, requested by Pennsylvania colonists.

Integral to the founding of the first Lutheran church body or denomination in North America, Muhlenberg is considered the patriarch of the Lutheran Church in the United States. Muhlenberg and his wife Anna Maria had a large family, several of whom had a significant impact on colonial life in North America as pastors, military officers, and politicians. His and Anna Maria's descendants continued to be active in Pennsylvania and national political life.

Early life in Germany
Muhlenberg was born in 1711 to Nicolaus Melchior Mühlenberg and Anna Maria Kleinschmid at Einbeck, in the German Electorate of Hanover. He studied theology at the University of Göttingen. As a student, Muhlenberg came under the influence of the Pietist movement through fellow students from Einbeck who had worked at the Francke Foundations in Halle (Saale), an important Pietist institution. With two other men, Muhlenberg started a charity school in Göttingen that eventually became an orphanage.

After completing his studies in spring 1738, Muhlenberg secured a teaching position at the Francke Foundation's Historic Orphanage. Its director, the theologian Gotthilf August Francke was the son and successor of the Foundation's founder, August Hermann Francke and a professor at the University of Halle.

Muhlenberg was ordained in Leipzig in 1739, and served as assistant minister and director of the orphanage at Grosshennersdorf from 1739 to 1741. In 1741, Gotthilf August Francke encouraged Muhlenberg to accept a call from German-speaking Lutherans in Pennsylvania. Accordingly, in 1742 Muhlenberg emigrated across the Atlantic Ocean, where he essentially organized the Lutheran Church as an institution in North America.

Lutheran Church in Pennsylvania and New Jersey
 The Lutheran churches in Pennsylvania had largely been founded by lay ministers. As Nicolaus Ludwig Zinzendorf was successful in winning a number of converts to the Moravian Church, the Lutherans asked German churches for formally trained clergy.

In 1742, Muhlenberg immigrated to Philadelphia, responding to the 1732 request by Pennsylvania Lutherans. He took charge of the congregation at Providence (Augustus Lutheran Church), in what is now Trappe, Pennsylvania. He also provided leadership to a series of congregations from Maryland to New York, working to secure control over less qualified pastors and starting new congregations among the settlers of the region. In 1748, he called together The Ministerium of Pennsylvania, the first permanent Lutheran synod in America. He helped to prepare a uniform liturgy that same year, and also wrote basic tenets for an ecclesiastical constitution, which most of the churches adopted in 1761. He did much work on a hymnal, published by the Ministerium in 1786.

The dedication stone of the Augustus Lutheran Church, above its door, is dedicated to Muhlenberg and its other founders. It reads, in Latin, translated into English: "Under the auspices of Christ, Henry Melchior Muhlenberg with his Council, J.N.Crosman, F.Marsteller, A.Heilman, J.Mueller, H.Haas, and H.Rebner, erected from the very foundation this building dedicated by the Society of the Augsburg Confession. A.D.1743." This is the only known church building bearing an inscription that designates the confessional document of the congregation instead of the name Lutheran by which it is popularly known. The name of the first church—Augustus—was adopted in honor of Herman Augustus Francke, founder of the Halle Institutions, whose son, Gotthilf, had persuaded Muhlenberg to accept the call of the three United Congregations in America.

Muhlenberg frequently traveled beyond the three congregations assigned to him. During his 45-year ministry, he reached from New York to Georgia. He ministered not only to the German-language populations he was assigned to, but also to colonists from the Netherlands and Britain as well, in their native languages. His colleagues requested his help in arbitrating disputes among Lutherans, or in some cases with other religious groups.

Muhlenberg also worked to recruit new ministers from Europe and to develop more ministers from the colonists. In Washington Township, Morris County, New Jersey, the Old Stone Union Church (built 1774) of German Valley (later renamed Long Valley) housed a congregation said to have been organized by Muhlenberg. His eldest son, the Reverend Peter Gabriel Muhlenberg, also served as pastor there and served as a major general in the Continental Army.

Poor health forced him into limited activity and retirement. He eventually died at his home in Trappe, Pennsylvania, at age 76. He was interred in the rear of Augustus Lutheran Church with his wife Anna Maria, followed by their son Peter. By request, he was buried next to the grave of his good friend, sponsor, and Augustus Church co-founder, Frederick Ludwig Marsteller.

Dynasty
Soon after arriving in Pennsylvania, in 1745, Muhlenberg married Anna Maria Weiser, the daughter of colonial leader Conrad Weiser. The couple had eleven children and founded the Muhlenberg Family dynasty, generations of which were active in the US military, politics, academia and ministry.

Of their children, three sons entered the ministry and became prominent in other fields as well. Their son Peter became a Major General in the Continental Army and later was elected to the U.S. Congress. Frederick served as the first Speaker of the House in the U.S. Congress after his election to office. Henry, Jr. became pastor of the Zion Lutheran Church at Oldwick, New Jersey. Henry Ernst was an early scientist, and the first president of Franklin College (now Franklin & Marshall).

Their daughter Elisabeth married future general Francis Swaine. Maria Salome ("Sally") married the future US Congressman, Matthias Richards. Eve married Emmanuel Shulze, and their son John Andrew Schulze was elected Governor of Pennsylvania.

Legacy and honors
Henry Melchior Muhlenberg is commemorated on October 7 in the Calendar of Saints in worship books, hymnals (e.g., Lutheran Book of Worship, Lutheran Worship, Evangelical Lutheran Worship, and Lutheran Service Book), and supplementary ecumenical common liturgies and lectionaries used by most Lutheran congregations in the United States and Canada.
Muhlenberg College, an ELCA affiliated institution, in Allentown, Pennsylvania is named in his honor.
The "Muhlenberg Monument" entitled "Man of Vision," sculpted by American artist Stanley Wanlass is located on the campus of Muhlenberg College.
Lake Muhlenberg, located near the college in Allentown is also named in his honor.
The Henry Melchior Muhlenberg House was added to the National Register of Historic Places (maintained by the National Park Service of the U.S. Department of the Interior) in 2000.
The Muhlenberg Building, at 2900 Queens Lane, a distinctive U-shaped two-story structure of Georgian / Federal style of architecture with red brick and white wood / limestone trim - served as the headquarters of the former Muhlenberg Press (and editorial offices of "The Lutheran" bi-monthly magazine) of the former United Lutheran Church in America (1918-1962) ànd its successor of Fortress Press, the Board of Publication of the Lutheran Church in America (1962-1987) in northwest Philadelphia. Both the ULCA and later, the LCA, had their denominational offices at the Church House on Madison Avenue in Manhattan, New York City. Upon merger in 1988 into the Evangelical Lutheran Church in America, publishing operations were moved to Minneapolis and combined with Augsburg Publishing House of The American Lutheran Church there and continuing as Augsburg Fortress. ELCA headquarters are in suburban Chicago.

See also
 Muhlenberg family
Johann Christopher Kunze

References

Other sources
 Mann, William J. Life and Times of Henry Melchior Muhlenberg, Philadelphia: G.W. Frederick. 1888
Wolf, Edmund Jacob. The Lutherans in America; a story of struggle, progress, influence and marvelous growth, New York: J.A. Hill. 1889
Frick, William K. Henry Melchior Muhlenberg, Patriarch of the Lutheran Church in America, Lutheran Publication Society, 1902
 Hermann Wellenreuther / Thomas Müller-Bahlke / A. Gregg Roeber: The Transatlantic World of Heinrich Melchior Mühlenberg in the Eighteenth Century. Publisher: Otto Harrassowitz (January 9, 2013),

Further reading

External links
 Biographical Sketches of memorable Christians of the Past, Anglican Church
Evangelical Lutheran Ministerium
Early Evangelical Lutheran Heroes in America, Holy Trinity, New Rochelle, NY

1711 births
1787 deaths
People from Einbeck
Muhlenberg family
University of Göttingen alumni
German emigrants to the Thirteen Colonies
People celebrated in the Lutheran liturgical calendar
People from the Electorate of Hanover
People from Washington Township, Morris County, New Jersey
18th-century American Lutheran clergy
German Lutheran missionaries
Lutheran missionaries in the United States
18th-century Lutheran theologians